John Hixon Shaffer (February 25, 1919 – September 14, 1997) was an administrator of the Federal Aviation Administration from March 24, 1969 until March 14, 1973.

Shaffer was the administrator during an en-masse calling-in sick strike by air traffic controllers during 1969. In the summer, Shaffer testified to a congressional committee that air traffic controllers were neither overworked nor underpaid. Shaffer's testimony increased pressure on controllers to return to their jobs. Celebrity lawyer F. Lee Bailey of the Professional Air Traffic Controllers Organization (PATCO) stated, "This guy Shaffer has got to go." The FAA and Shaffer were both later attacked by the PATCO for continuing to operate the air traffic system despite the low number of  controllers.

On December 3, 1970, he testified to Congress about aviation safety.

Following his retirement from the FAA, Shaffer was involved in a debate over the use of microwave landing systems in civil aviation and which country's industry should be awarded a contract for construction of the equipment: the U.S., U.K., or Germany. Shaffer himself agreed with British assessments that the American manufactured MLS system was inferior and poorly tested.

Awards
1972 Wright Brothers Memorial Trophy

Notes

Administrators of the Federal Aviation Administration
1919 births
1997 deaths
Nixon administration personnel